Claudia Verdino (born 28 November 2001) is a Monegasque swimmer. She competed in the women's 200 metre backstroke event at the 2017 World Aquatics Championships. In 2018, she competed in swimming at the 2018 Summer Youth Olympics held in Buenos Aires, Argentina.

References

External links
 

2001 births
Living people
Monegasque female swimmers
Swimmers at the 2018 Mediterranean Games
Swimmers at the 2022 Mediterranean Games
Swimmers at the 2018 Summer Youth Olympics
Place of birth missing (living people)
Female backstroke swimmers
Mediterranean Games competitors for Monaco
Swimmers at the 2020 Summer Olympics
Olympic swimmers of Monaco